Henry Hammel may refer to:

 Henry Hammel (California businessman) (1833/1834–1890), businessman and politician
 Henry A. Hammel (1840–1902), Union Army soldier and Medal of Honor recipient